The Boeing 777X is the latest series of the long-range, wide-body, twin-engine jetliners in the Boeing 777 family from Boeing Commercial Airplanes. The 777X features new GE9X engines, new composite wings with folding wingtips, greater cabin width and seating capacity, and technologies from the Boeing 787. The 777X was launched in November 2013 with two variants: the 777-8 and the 777-9. The 777-8 provides seating for 384 passengers and has a range of 8,730 nmi (16,170 km) while the 777-9 has seating for 426 passengers and a range of over 7,285 nmi (13,500 km).

The 777X program was proposed in the early 2010s with assembly at the Boeing Everett Factory and the wings built at a new building adjacent to the Everett factory. , there are 363 total orders for the 777X passenger and freighter versions from ten identified customers and other buyers. The 777-9 first flew on January 25, 2020, with deliveries delayed multiple times and expected to commence in 2025.

Development

Initial design
In 2011, Boeing refined its response to the revamped Airbus A350 XWB with three 777X models, targeting a firm configuration in 2015, flying in late 2017 or 2018, and entering service by 2019. A 8LX with the 9X MTOW would have a  range. The current 777-200LR/300ER have a  MTOW.

It would fall into ICAO aerodrome code F like the 747-8 and A380 but with  folding wingtips it would stay within the  code E like current 777s. Horizontal stabilizers would be extended.

Engine selection
The General Electric GE90-115B of the earlier 777-200LR and -300ER variants has a 42:1 overall pressure ratio and 23:1  compressor ratio. Rolls-Royce Plc proposed its RB3025 concept with a  fan diameter, a 12:1 bypass ratio, and a 62:1 overall pressure ratio, targeting a fuel burn of more than 10% lower than the GE90-115B and 15% lower than its Trent 800 powering the 777; the RB3025 concept has a composite fan, a core derived from the Trent 1000, and advanced HP materials. Pratt & Whitney responded with the  thrust PW1000G geared turbofan architecture. GE Aviation proposed the GE9X with a  diameter fan, a 10:1 bypass ratio, a 60:1 overall pressure ratio, and 27:1 HP compressor ratio for a 10% fuel burn reduction.

In March 2013, Boeing selected the GE9X with a  fan. It is the largest fan made by GE.

Some customers bemoan the loss of engine competition, like Air Lease Corporation's CEO Steven Udvar-Hazy who wanted a choice of engines. Airbus points out that handling more than one engine type adds millions of dollars to an airliner cost. Pratt and Whitney said: "Engines are no longer commodities...the optimization of the engine and the aircraft becomes more relevant."

Launch

In 2012, with the Boeing 737 MAX in development and the 787-10 launch in preparation, Boeing decided to slow 777X development to reduce the risk with introduction still forecast for 2019. On May 1, 2013, Boeing's board of directors approved selling the 353-seat 777-8LX to replace the 777-300ER from 2021, after the larger 406-seat -9X.

The design work is distributed between Charleston, Huntsville, Long Beach, Philadelphia, and St. Louis in the U.S and Moscow, Russia. Its development cost could be over $5 billion with at least $2 billion for the carbon-composite wing.

On September 18, 2013, Lufthansa became its launch customer by selecting 34 Boeing 777-9X airliners, along with 25 Airbus A350-900s to replace its 22 747-400s and 48 A340-300/600s for its long-haul fleet. This was the largest commercial aircraft launch by dollar value with Emirates ordering 150, Qatar Airways 50, and Etihad Airways 25, in addition to the September 2013 Lufthansa commitment for 34 aircraft. Boeing dropped the variants' "X" suffix, while keeping the 777X program name at the 2015 Dubai Airshow.

In June 2017, Lufthansa was considering delaying 777X deliveries and could limit its -9 orders to 20 and order more A350s. Due to its large order, Emirates will become the first operator instead of Lufthansa.

Production

In December 2014, Boeing began construction on a new  composites facility in St. Louis to be completed in 2016, to build 777X parts with six autoclaves for the wing and empennage parts, starting in 2017. The 787 'surge' line at the Everett factory would be converted into a 777X early production line by the end of 2015. Boeing built a new  building adjacent to the Everett factory, with a  autoclave, and a robot to wind fiber for the wings. The first 777X was planned to be built on the ex-787 "surge" line.

The -9 firm-configuration was reached in August 2015 and assembly of the initial aircraft was to begin in 2017 for a December 2019 introduction advanced from the previously scheduled 2020. With a current 777 production rate of 100 per year, 380 on order at the end of 2013 and no orders at the February 2014 Singapore Airshow, bridging the gap to the 777X deliveries starting from 2020 is a challenge: to stimulate orders, sales of current 777s can be paired with 777Xs and used 777s can be converted to freighters to be sold and stimulate new sales.

2017
In April 2017, the initial one-piece wing spar came onto the assembly jig and was about to enter lay-up in June; first parts assembly for the initial -9, a static test airframe, were underway in the purpose-built wing center near Everett, Washington. Four -9s, a fatigue-test airframe, and two -8s were planned for testing. Tests of avionics, power and integrated systems continue in Boeing Field laboratories and were integrated into an "Airplane Zero" in 2017 as 70% detailed design was done by June 2017.

The assembly of the first composite wing test example began in Everett in late September 2017 with its top section lowered into a jig for robotic drilling. Boeing launched the 777-9 production on October 23 with the wing spar drilling; its maiden flight was scheduled in the first quarter of 2019, one year before its introduction, perhaps with Emirates.

On November 7, 90% of the engineering drawings were released, with the airframe before the systems: 99% of the wing and 98% of the fuselage drawings are released. The detailed design phase was expected to be completed in 2017 as avionics, power and other systems are ready for ground tests. Aircraft Numbers 1 and 6 were planned to be used for ground tests; four 777-9s (No. 2 to 5) were slated for the flight test and certification campaign, with two 777-8s to come later. Final assembly was planned to start in 2018 before roll-out the same year.

The 777X production techniques were expected to be major cost-cutters. The Fuselage Automated Upright Build (FAUB) system was developed and quietly tested in Anacortes, Washington, 40 miles north of the 777 Everett assembly plant. A major leap in automated production, it drills the tens of thousands of holes in the fuselage more quickly, accurately, and safely. The wings are the first produced by Boeing in composite and not out-sourced like for the 787, and production is largely automated as well. The specifically built billion-dollar factory has excess capacity, laying the foundation for the company's expected future programs: the New Midsize Airplane (NMA) and later the New Small Airplane to replace the 737.

2018

In February 2018, Subaru (ex–Fuji Heavy Industries) completed the first aluminum and titanium center wingbox integrated with main landing gear wheel wells at its Handa factory. The factory was completed in April 2016 and started operation in 2017. It has  of floor space and is equipped with automatic riveters, transfer, and painting machines.

Boeing's first composite wing spars, stringers, and skin panels are formed in the $1 billion Composite Wing Center before assembly on a new horizontal build line. In February 2018, its wing components were ready to go through assembly as Mitsubishi Heavy Industries, the 787 composite wings manufacturer, advised Boeing on the wing assembly. At this time, 93–95% of the design was released: complete for structures and in progress for systems and engine installation before interiors.

Fuselage subassemblies started shipping on February 7: aft fuselage panels from Mitsubishi Heavy Industries, center and forward fuselage panels from Kawasaki Heavy Industries and the 11/45 center wingbox from Subaru. In March, fuselage assembly was to begin in Everett at a temporary production line between the current 747-8 and 777 assembly lines to avoid disrupting the 777-300ER production. The static airframe and the first flight-test aircraft bodies were to be joined in the second quarter of 2018 and in June–July, respectively.

Scheduled for the start of 2018, the GE9X first flight has been delayed by the variable stator vane actuator arms redesign but the slip should not change the engine certification schedule or the first flight of the 777X. The flight-test engines were to be shipped later in 2018, before the year-end roll out and first flight expected in February 2019. During the new component development, two temporary engines were to be placed on the first flight-test aircraft. Wing assembly is difficult, with the light but strong carbon-fiber material being less forgiving than traditional aluminum, and aircraft systems integration in a special demonstration lab is not as quick as planned.

The first 777-9 fuselage assembly started in March 2018. In May 2018, Qatar Airways head Akbar Al Baker thought development was a couple of months late but expects Boeing to catch up, provided no certification issues arise. To avoid disrupting current 777 assembly, a temporary low-rate assembly line was set up for up to 38 airframes before transitioning to the main FAL in the early 2020s. The first -9 roll-out is due in late 2018 and all four -9 prototypes are to join the flight tests by mid-2019, while the two -8 prototypes were to be assembled in 2020 before deliveries.

The first wing was completed in May for static tests before the flight test wings. By July 2018, 98% of its engineering had been released. By September, the static test 777X article was completed, lacking engines and various systems, ahead of its structural testing on ground. The first join on the static-test aircraft was done in 16 days instead of the planned 20 and lessons learned from the 787 wing-body join led to a single defect instead of hundreds usually in new models.

The final body join of the first flight test aircraft was completed by November, before an early 2019 rollout and a second quarter first flight. By late 2019, it should be joined in the flight program by the other four 777-9 prototypes which were undergoing assembly. The first flight-test aircraft was built 20% faster than the static airframe. At the end of November, the electric systems were powered on and the rollout was expected for February 2019. First deliveries are planned for May 2020 while the first production wing spar was going to be loaded in early December. To position wings and fuselage sections, automated guided vehicles are replacing overhead cranes and "monuments" - large, permanent tooling fixtures.
The primary systems were installed by December and its second GE9X engine were to be hung in early 2019.

2019
Engines were installed by early January 2019. The first 777-9 body join happened in February for a delivery planned in summer 2020 to Lufthansa. The roll-out of the prototype occurred on March 13, 2019, in a low-key employees-only event overshadowed by the crash of an Ethiopian Airlines 737 MAX 8 on March 10.

The GE9X engines installed on the 777X prototype were first run on May 29. However, a compressor anomaly occurred with another engine during pre-delivery tests, and the maiden flight previously planned for no earlier than June 26 was delayed while the engines are modified to a final certifiable configuration. , GE expressed confidence that the engine would receive certification during the fall and that the first flight of the 777X would still occur in 2019.
The 777X test plan was later revised as several months are required to develop and test fixes to the GE9X, and first flight slipped to October–November. By June, the first prototype began low-speed taxi tests.

On July 24, Boeing announced that the GE9X engine issue would delay the maiden flight until 2020. The company continued to target first deliveries in 2020, though it intends to boost production of current-generation 777 freighters in 2020.
GE Aviation in Ohio is recalling four GE9X turbofans from Boeing in Washington state in Antonov An-124 freighters from Volga-Dnepr Airlines, mounted in 26 x 14 x 13 ft (8 x 4 x 4 m), 36,000 lb (16.3 t) stands.

On September 5, in the presence of FAA inspectors, a cargo door blew off on the 777X static test airframe during the ultimate load test, which is conducted with the airplane stressed and pressurized beyond normal operating limits. Depending on the outcome of its root cause investigation, Boeing should have time to modify the failed part and repeat the test during the margin from the existing engine-related delays.
At 99% of ultimate load, 1.48 times the limit load, the aluminum skin ruptured under the center fuselage, aft of the wing, and the damaged structure extended up the fuselage side to a passenger plug door which blew out − and not an outward-hinged cargo door.

In October 2019, the JATR board created to review the Boeing 737 MAX certification noted that the FAA would need to assess more thoroughly how modifications interact with the aircraft. The FAA did not announce how its review and certification of the 777X may be affected. The 777X was already a year behind schedule as service introduction was targeted for 2022, a further delay due to the certification as a derivative could risk key orders.

Boeing received the first flight compliant GE9X on October 18 with a second engine due by the end of the month, for a mid-November power up.
On November 13, the FAUB robotic system was abandoned after six years of implementation, to use human machinists more.
By mid-November, a pair of flight compliant engines were installed on the first 777-9.

2020
As part of an investigation by the FAA into the fatal crashes of the Boeing 737 MAX aircraft, emails were released that showed that a problematic supplier of parts for the 737 MAX flight simulators was still being used for 777X simulators, on an even more aggressive schedule. Boeing stated that the 777X does not have an equivalent of the Maneuvering Characteristics Augmentation System (MCAS) that is installed on the 737 MAX and that played a role in two crashes.

Testing
The first test flight took place on January 25, 2020, at 10:09 a.m. from Paine Field in Everett, and ended in Boeing Field in Seattle after 3 hours and 52 minutes. The second 777X first flew on April 30, by which point the first had explored the flight envelope for nearly 100 hours.

2021 
In January 2021, Boeing expected to add two more 777-9s to the test program, aiming for certification in 2021. After the first delivery was pushed back from 2021 to 2022, the third aircraft made its maiden flight on August 3; it is slated for avionics systems, APU, flight loads and propulsion performance tests.

In early 2021, first delivery was pushed to late 2023. The delay was due to updated type certification requirements and the impact of the COVID-19 pandemic on aviation, costing a $6.5 billion charge. 

On June 27, 2021, The Seattle Times reported on an FAA letter to Boeing dated May 13 delaying type certification until mid to late 2023, pushing deliveries to 2024. The FAA cited a serious test flight incident involving an "uncommanded pitch event" and a lack of "design maturity".

2022 
In April 2022, Boeing again delayed 777X deliveries, this time to 2025. In 2012, the 777X was planned to enter service in 2019.

In November 2022, it was revealed that a GE9X engine on one of the four test 777-9s suffered a technical issue on October 6. Boeing subsequently paused the test program while GE investigated the issue.

Design

Wing

The 777X has a new longer composite wing with folding wingtips. Due to this, the 777X is the first aircraft to have 'Wingtip Controls' inside the cockpit.

To stay within the size category of the current 777 with a less than  wingspan, it features  folding wingtips with the folding wingtip actuation system made by Liebherr Aerospace. The mechanism was demonstrated for Aviation Week at the Boeing Everett Factory in October 2016; the folding movement should be complete in 20 seconds and be locked in place at the end. Specific alerts and procedures are needed to handle a malfunction.

As existing regulations do not cover the folding wingtips, the FAA issued special conditions, including proving their load-carrying limits, demonstrating their handling qualities in a crosswind when raised, alerting the crew when they are not correctly positioned while the mechanism and controls will be further inspected. Those ten special conditions were to be published on May 18, 2018, covering worst-case scenarios.

Transported by sea from Subaru in Nagoya to Everett, the center wing-box is similar in size to the legacy 777 but is more reinforced and heavier, with more titanium.

Interior
Its flight deck is similar to the 787 cockpit with large displays and head-up displays, controls for the new folding wingtips, and touchscreens replacing cursor control devices. Windows are dimmable.

Efficiency
For the longer 777-9, new engines should improve fuel consumption by 10%, with the longer, carbon-fiber wings adding an estimated 7% improvement. As 4 to 5% of fuel savings is lost from the 12 tons heavier basic structure of the larger airliner, the net fuel efficiency gain is projected to be 12 to 13%. Ten-abreast seating instead of nine with a longer fuselage enable a reduction in fuel burn per seat of 20% compared to the 365-seat 777-300ER. The longer-range, 355-seat 777-8 should have a 13% improvement in fuel consumption with 10 fewer seats than the -300ER.
Boeing forecast a 33% better cost per seat than the 747-400 and 13% better than the 777-300ER.

Its maximum takeoff weight is targeted for  like the 777-300ER but Boeing hopes to have at least a  margin at introduction. Boeing predicts the -8 to be 4% more fuel efficient and cost effective than the A350-1000, while the -9 would be 12% more fuel efficient and 11% more cost effective. Lufthansa, when it ordered both, stated the Airbus A350-900 and the 777-9X will consume an average of 2.9 L/100 km per passenger.

Variants

777-9

The 777-9 is stretched by three extra seat rows and flies  farther than the 777-300ER with the same weight. It is  longer than the -300ER for a  length. It will seat typically 426 passengers over a range of 7,285 nmi (13,500 km). Boeing froze its design in August 2015 and was to start first assembly in 2017. Its operating empty weight grew from the 777-300ER's , just over, for the -9 target. Listed at $442 million, valuation specialist Avitas estimates the -9 real purchase price at around $200 million.

In 2017, crowd-sourced stock advising website Seeking Alpha estimated a  manufacturer empty weight and a  operating empty weight. The first flight of the 777-9 was on Saturday, January 25, 2020. The 777-9 is to supersede the  Boeing 747-8 as the longest airliner.

777-8
It would seat typically 384 passengers with a range of 8,730 nmi (16,170 km). It would succeed the ultra-long-range 777-200LR and compete with the Airbus A350-1000. 

Production of the -8 was expected to follow the -9 around two years later. It could be the basis of a freighter version which could be available 18 to 24 months after the introduction of the -8.

Due to the Boeing 737 MAX groundings and the delayed first flight of the 777-9, in 2019 Boeing pushed back design and development of the 777-8 until at least 2021, for first deliveries in 2023 or beyond. The delays were not expected to affect Boeing's participation in Qantas' Project Sunrise, for which it has proposed a 777-8 variant. Boeing also proposed an interim solution to Qantas, assumed to comprise a 777-9 with auxiliary fuel tanks and reduced seating capacity. However, Qantas subsequently preferred the Airbus A350-1000 for this project. The -8 would also fill the niche market for an aircraft capable of flying with a full payload from hubs in the Gulf states to the West Coast of the United States. It could, however, be cancelled if customers find the -9 acceptable for these routes.

BBJ 777X
On December 10, 2018, Boeing launched Boeing Business Jet variants at the Middle East Business Aviation Association Show. The BBJ 777-8 offers a range of 11,645 nautical miles (21,570 km) and a 3,256 sq ft (302.5 sq m) cabin, while the BBJ 777-9 provides a 3,689 sq ft (342.7 sq m) cabin and a range of 11,000 nautical miles (20,370 km).

777-8F 
In June 2019, Qatar Airways urged Boeing to develop a 777X-based freighter to replace its existing 777Fs which were first delivered in 2009. Boeing confirmed that discussions were under way to define a timeline for a freighter variant, expected to be based on the 777-8 airframe. In July 2021, Boeing CEO David Calhoun viewed a freighter version as a logical next aircraft program to comply with emerging ICAO aircraft emission standards. On January 31, 2022, Boeing officially launched the 777-8 Freighter, with an order from Qatar Airways for 34 aircraft and 16 options, with deliveries expected to begin in 2027.

777-10X
Boeing is proposing to stretch the -9 by four rows of seats to accommodate 450 passengers in a 777-10X variant to compete with the Airbus A380 superjumbo. The company has approached several airlines including Emirates, the largest operator of both the 777 and the A380. The A380 seats between 489 and 615 passengers. Boeing confirmed that the 777 stretch is feasible if there is interest. The A380 ended production in December 2021.

Orders

Order history
On September 19, 2013, Lufthansa became the first airline to select the 777X when it placed an order for 34 777-9 airliners, but the order was later changed to 20 firm orders and 14 options. This was followed in May 2022 with an announcement for an order of seven 777-8 Freighters destined for Lufthansa Cargo operations.

In December 2013, Hong Kong-based Cathay Pacific ordered 21 777-9 airliners with deliveries expected from 2021, they will now not join Cathay's fleet before 2025.

In July 2014, Emirates, the launch customer, finalized its order for 150 777X aircraft, consisting of 115 777-9s and 35 777-8s. On July 16, Qatar Airways finalized its order for 50 777-9 aircraft, with purchase rights for 50 more 777-9s. On July 31, Japan's All Nippon Airways finalized an order for 20 Boeing 777-9s.

In December 2016, Iran Air signed an agreement with Boeing that includes 15 777-9 aircraft, but this agreement was effectively cancelled when the United States withdrew from the Iran Nuclear Deal in May 2018.

In February 2017, Singapore Airlines signed a letter of intent with Boeing for 20 777-9 and 19 787-10 airliners; this was firmed in June 2017. In June 2017, the three Persian Gulf carriers (Emirates, Etihad Airways and Qatar Airways) held 235 orders, % of the 340 commitments, which were less financially secure than previously. Etihad's widespread investing strategy had backfired as it reduced feed sources, making it harder to fill the orders for the 777X. Emirates' demand had been slowing and it was considering deferral of deliveries, having the smallest sovereign wealth fund backing of the Gulf carriers. Qatar Airways was facing economic concerns and was suffering from a diplomatic crisis with its neighbors.

After a nearly $2 billion loss in 2016, Etihad had to cut routes and shrink its fleet and thus is considering canceling or deferring its orders, preferring to incur cancellations penalties rather than recurring losses from overcapacity. On February 14, 2019, it was reported that Etihad would take only 6 of the 25 777X airliners it had originally ordered.

On February 28, 2019, British Airways parent International Airlines Group ordered up to 42 777-9, 18 firm and 24 options, valued at up to $18.6 billion, to replace its 747-400s. On November 7, Lufthansa stated it had converted 14 orders into options, leaving 6 firm commitments, after having negotiated a change as part of its order for 20 787s. 

On November 20, Emirates reduced its order total to 115 in exchange for ordering 30 Boeing 787-9s, while remaining the largest 777X customer.

In January 2021, Boeing reduced its sales expectation for the program from 400 to 350 aircraft. Boeing reclassified 118 orders from firm to uncertain under the ASC 606 accounting rule, for 191 orders down from 309 previously. On February 9, Singapore Airlines announced that they had converted an order for 14 Boeing 787-10 Dreamliners into 11 Boeing 777-9s; bringing its order for the 777-9 to 31.

On January 31, 2022, Qatar Airways became the launch customer for the 777X Freighter program, with an order of up to 50 777-8 Freighters, expanding its commitment to the Boeing 777X family. In March 2022, Ethiopian Airlines signed a memorandum of understanding for five 777-8Fs.

On February 11, 2023, Air India ordered 10 777-9s as part of a combined 470 aircraft order from both Airbus and Boeing. The order also includes Boeing 787 and 737 MAX airliners.

Order summary

Data

Specifications

See also

Notes

References

Further reading
 
 
  or

External links 

 

777X
Boeing 777
Twinjets
Proposed aircraft of the United States
Aircraft first flown in 2020